The Roman Catholic Diocese of Talca, (in Latin: Dioecesis Talcensis), is a suffragan diocese of the archdiocese of Santiago de Chile. Its current bishop, Galo Fernández Villaseca, was appointed on 20 March 2021.  
The diocesan cathedral is in the city of Talca.

History
The dioceses of Talca, of Rancagua and of San Felipe were erected by Pope Pius XI on 18 October 1925 by means of the Bulla "Notabiliter Aucto".

Diocesan statistics
The diocese lies in the Maule Region of Chile and covers a territory of 17,000 km². It is comprised by the province of Curicó and by eight municipalities (comunas) of the province of Talca (the parishes of the municipalities of Empedrado and Constitución are jurisdictionally attached to the neighboring diocese of Linares, from an ecclesiastical point of view). The diocese is divided into 45 parishes (as of April 2015), grouped in 5 pastoral zones.

Bishops
 Miguel León Prado (apostolic administrator) † (12 June 1913 – 18 October 1925 appointed, auxiliary bishop of Santiago de Chile)
 Carlos Silva Cotapos † (14 December 1925 – 21 January 1939 resigned)
 Manuel Larraín Errázuriz † (21 January 1939 succeeded – 22 June 1966 died)
 Carlos González Cruchaga (4 January 1967 – 12 December 1996 retired)
 Horacio del Carmen Valenzuela Abarca (12 December 1996 appointed – 28 June 2018 retired)
 Galo Fernández Villaseca (20 March 2021 appointed – present)

Coadjutor bishop
Manuel Larraín Errazuriz  (1938-1939

Auxiliary bishops
Bernardino Piñera Carvallo (1958-1960), appointed Bishop of Temuco
Enrique Alvear Urrutia (1963-1965), appointed Bishop of San Felipe
Alejandro Jiménez Lafeble (1975-1983), appointed Bishop of Valdivia
Pablo Lizama Riquelme (1988-1991), appointed Bishop of Melipilla 
Alejandro Goić Karmelić (1991-1994), appointed Bishop of Osorno

Other priest of this diocese who became bishops
Miguel León Prado (Vicar General here, 1913-1925), appointed Bishop of Linares

Pastoral zones and Parishes

Pastoral zones

Urban Talca
 El Sagrario
 Corazón de María
 Nuestra Señora de Fátima
 San Luis
 Santa Ana
 St. Augustine Cathedral 
 San Sebastián
 Inmaculada Concepción
 Los Doce Apóstoles
 Santa Teresita
 La Merced
 Espíritu Santo
 Sagrada Familia
 San Alberto Hurtado

Rural Talca
 San José, Colín (Maule)
 Sagrado Corazón, Maule
 San José, Duao (Maule)
 San Rafael, San Rafael 
 San José, Pelarco
 San Clemente, San Clemente
 Inmaculada Concepción, Pencahue
 Bajos de Lircay,  San Clemente
 Santa Amalia, El Sauce (Talca)
 Sagrado Corazón, Gualleco (Curepto)

Urban Curicó
 La Merced
 San Juan Bautista
 Nuestra Señora del Rosario
 Cristo Resucitado
 Jesús Obrero
 Jesús de Nazareth
 Iglesia San Francisco 
 San José 
 Santa Fé

Rural Curicó
 San Juan de Dios, Teno 
 Nuestra Señora del Pilar, Romeral
 San Pedro, Rauco 
 San Bonifacio, Lontué 
 Unidad Pastoral, Sarmiento (Curicó)
 Nuestra Señora del Tránsito, Molina 
 Sagrada Familia, Sagrada Familia
 Nuestra Señora de Lourdes, Cordillerilla (Los Niches, Curicó)
 San Pedro y San Pablo, Comunidad de Casablanca (Lontué)
 Nuestra Señora de la Merced, Cumpeo (Río Claro)

Coastal Zone
 Inmaculada Concepción, Villa Prat (Sagrada Familia)
 Santísimo Sacramento, Hualañé
 Nuestra Señora del Rosario, Curepto
 San Miguel Arcángel, Licantén
 Nuestra Señora del Carmen, Vichuquén
 San Policarpo, La Huerta de Mataquito (Hualañé)
 Vice-Parish of Llico (Vichuquén)

External links
Website of the diocese (in Spanish)
www.catholic-hierarchy.org: Diocese of Talca

References

Roman Catholic dioceses in Chile
Christian organizations established in 1925
Roman Catholic dioceses and prelatures established in the 20th century
Talca, Roman Catholic Diocese of